Stephone Anthony (born July 28, 1992) is a former American football linebacker and current coach. He played college football at Clemson.

Early years
A native of Polkton, North Carolina, Anthony attended Anson High School, where he was a four-year starter. Anthony had 123 tackles, 16 tackles for loss, four sacks, and two interceptions as a senior in 2010.

In addition to football, Anthony was also a catcher on the baseball team and a power forward on the basketball team, as well as a track athlete (11.3 s in the 100m).

Regarded as a five-star recruit by Rivals.com, Anthony was rated the No. 3 outside linebackers prospect. He chose Clemson over UNC, Florida, and Virginia Tech.

College career
He appeared in all 13 games in 2011, including three starts. For the season, he registered 32 tackles, six tackles for loss, two sacks, a pass breakup, and a team-high two caused fumbles in 292 snaps. He started seven of 13 games as a sophomore, recording 77 tackles, one sack and an interception. Anthony started all 13 games as a junior in 2013. He recorded a team-high 131 tackles with four sacks and an interception.

Professional career

New Orleans Saints
Anthony was selected in the first round (31st overall) of the 2015 NFL Draft by the New Orleans Saints. The pick originally belonged to the Seattle Seahawks, and was traded to the Saints in the Max Unger-Jimmy Graham trade.

2015
On May 12, 2015, the Saints signed him to a four-year, $7.73 million contract with $6.24 million guaranteed and a signing bonus of $3.38 million.

He recorded his first sack October 4 in the Saint's 26-20 win over the Dallas Cowboys. In a Week 3 game against the Carolina Panthers, Anthony was fined $17,363 for his hit on wide receiver Devin Funchess. During the Saints' Week 12 matchup also against the Carolina Panthers, Anthony stopped running back Jonathan Stewart after a handoff up the middle, stripped the ball, then ran it back for a touchdown. Nobody chased him as everyone assumed the play was dead. In the same game, Anthony also became the first person in NFL history to return a blocked kick for two points after Kevin Williams blocked an extra point, following a rule change that took effect in the offseason to allow such returns. Anthony recorded his 100th tackle in a Week 15 game against the Detroit Lions, where he also forced a fumble. He became the first Saints' rookie to record 100 tackles in a season since Hall of Fame linebacker Rickey Jackson.

Anthony finished his rookie season with 112 tackles, one sack, one interception, and two forced fumbles. He had two scores, both coming against the Carolina Panthers, and led all rookies in tackles. Anthony was also named to the Pro Football Writers Association all-rookie team.

2016
On May 14, 2016, it was announced that Anthony would be moved to strongside linebacker, a position he never played before in the NFL. Anthony would go on to only play in 10 games in the regular season, recording 16 tackles. On December 20 he was placed on the injured reserve list, ending his 2016 season.

Miami Dolphins
On September 19, 2017, Anthony was traded to the Miami Dolphins for a 2018 fifth-round draft pick.

On May 2, 2018, the Dolphins declined the fifth-year option on Anthony's contract, making him a free agent in 2019.

Atlanta Falcons
On July 26, 2019, Anthony signed with the Atlanta Falcons. He was released on August 18, 2019.

New York Jets
On August 20, 2019, Anthony signed with the New York Jets. He was released on August 31, 2019.

New Orleans Saints (second stint)
On September 25, 2019, Anthony signed with the New Orleans Saints. He was released on October 16, but was re-signed a week later.

Arizona Cardinals
On November 16, 2020, Anthony was signed to the Arizona Cardinals practice squad. He was released on November 24, 2020.

Coaching career
In 2022, Anthony began his coaching career, joining the staff at his alma mater, Clemson, as a defensive graduate assistant.

References

External links
 Clemson Tigers bio
 New Orleans Saints bio

1992 births
Living people
American football linebackers
Arizona Cardinals players
Atlanta Falcons players
Clemson Tigers football players
New Orleans Saints players
New York Jets players
Miami Dolphins players
People from Polkton, North Carolina
Players of American football from North Carolina